Glyn (Glynne) England  (1921-2013) was a British electrical engineer.

Early life
He attended Penarth County Grammar School (now Stanwell School), then Queen Mary College in London.

Career
Prior to World War II, he was scientific assistant with the Road Research Laboratory.

In the 1950s, he served as a Labour Party councillor in Hertfordshire; he later became a founder member of the Social Democratic party.

CEGB
Glyn started working for the Central Electricity Generating Board as an electrical engineer supervising installation work. He finished up as chairman from 1977 to 1982, taking over from Sir Arthur Hawkins and being replaced by Walter Marshall, Baron Marshall of Goring.

A deal was signed with Glyn of the CEGB and Charles Chevrier, director-general of Électricité de France for the construction of a £550 million 2000MW HVDC Cross-Channel link between England and France. Each would cover the cost of four of the eight cables crossing the channel.

References

1921 births
2013 deaths
British electrical engineers
People educated at Stanwell School
People from Llantrisant